XHWM-FM is a radio station on 95.3 FM in San Cristóbal de las Casas, Chiapas. It is owned by Francisco José Narvaez Rincón and is known as Suprema Radio.

History
XEWM-AM 640 hit the air on July 7, 1969, owned by Plinio Medina Pérez and receiving its concession on October 27 of that year. The 250-watt station was the first in San Cristóbal, increasing its power to one kilowatt by the 1980s. In 2000, XHCRI-FM signed on as a noncommercial sister to XEWM.

In 2011, XEWM migrated to FM on 95.3 MHz. In 2018, it was authorized to move to Cerro Huitepec.

References

Radio stations in Chiapas
San Cristóbal de las Casas